The 1978–79 Indianapolis Racers season was the Racers' final season in the World Hockey Association (WHA). The team folded after only 25 games.

Offseason
Nelson Skalbania, the owner of Indianapolis Racers, signed the 17-year-old future super-star, Wayne Gretzky to, at that time, a whopping personal contract worth between 1.125 and 1.75 million dollars over 4 to 7 years. Skalbania, knowing that the WHA was fading, felt owning the young star was more valuable than owning a WHA team.

Regular season
This was the first season of Wayne Gretzky's professional career. The Racers' management knew that the team was going to fold
due to poor attendance, and sold Gretzky to the Edmonton Oilers after eight games. Skalbania needed cash and liquidated his greatest asset to his old friend and former partner, Peter Pocklington, owner of the Edmonton Oilers. Pocklington purchased Gretzky and two other Indianapolis players, goaltender Eddie Mio and forward Peter Driscoll paying $700,000 for the contracts of the three players, although the announced price was actually $850,000.

Final standings

Game log

Player stats

Regular season
Scoring

Goaltending

Note: Pos = Position; GP = Games played; G = Goals; A = Assists; Pts = Points; +/- = plus/minus; PIM = Penalty minutes; PPG = Power-play goals; SHG = Short-handed goals; GWG = Game-winning goals
      MIN = Minutes played; W = Wins; L = Losses; T = Ties; GA = Goals-against; GAA = Goals-against average; SO = Shutouts;

Awards and records

Transactions

Farm teams

See also
1978–79 WHA season

References

External links

Ind
Ind
Indianapolis Racers seasons